Sara Klein (born 19 May 1994) is an Australian athlete. She competed in the women's 400 metres hurdles event at the 2019 World Athletics Championships.

References

External links
 

1994 births
Living people
Australian female hurdlers
Place of birth missing (living people)
World Athletics Championships athletes for Australia